Odúver Daza is a Paralympian athlete from Venezuela competing mainly in category T12 sprint events.

Oduver has competed in two Paralympics, firstly in 2004 in Athens and then in 2008 in Beijing.  In Athens he competed in the T12 100m and F12 long jump failing to win any medals, in Beijing he again failed to win a medal in the F12 long jump, he however was a part of successful Venezuelan relay teams on both occasions winning a bronze in Athens in the T11-13 4 × 100 m and a silver in the same event in Beijing finishing behind the host country.

References

Paralympic athletes of Venezuela
Athletes (track and field) at the 2004 Summer Paralympics
Athletes (track and field) at the 2008 Summer Paralympics
Paralympic silver medalists for Venezuela
Paralympic bronze medalists for Venezuela
Living people
Medalists at the 2004 Summer Paralympics
Medalists at the 2008 Summer Paralympics
Year of birth missing (living people)
Paralympic medalists in athletics (track and field)
Venezuelan male sprinters
20th-century Venezuelan people
21st-century Venezuelan people